Freedom is a 1970 film by Yoko Ono. The film is a minute long and depicts Ono attempting to remove a purple brassire that she is wearing. The soundtrack to the film was composed and performed by John Lennon. Ono described it as a "great little film" in an interviewer with critic Scott MacDonald for the book A Critical Cinema 2: Interviews with Independent Filmmakers. MacDonald remarked that the film was "so paradoxical. You [Ono] show freedom as the ability to try and break free, which shows that you're never really free".

References

1970 films
Films directed by Yoko Ono
Films scored by John Lennon
Brassieres
1970s English-language films
1970s American films